Tenacibaculum agarivorans is a Gram-negative, aerobic, rod-shaped agar-digesting bacterium from the genus of Tenacibaculum which has been isolated from the alga (Porphyra yezoensis) from the coast of Weihai in China.

References

External links
Type strain of Tenacibaculum agarivorans at BacDive -  the Bacterial Diversity Metadatabase

Flavobacteria
Bacteria described in 2017